Marianne Beth (March 6, 1889, Vienna – August 19, 1984, New York City) was a Jewish Austrian lawyer and feminist. In 1921, she was the first Austrian woman to earn a doctorate in law.

Life
She was born Marianne Weisl into a  bourgeois Viennese family. Her father was a lawyer. In 1906, she married the Berlin theologian Karl Beth and converted from Judaism to Protestantism.

In 1908, she wished to study law herself, but entry into the law faculty in Vienna was not permitted to women at that time. So she first studied Orientalism, earning her doctorate on the subject of Oriental Languages. In 1919 the rules were changed, permitting her to enroll in Law. In 1921, she became the first woman doctor of law on the juridical faculty in Vienna as a lecturer. From 1928 she was active as a lawyer in practice.

She wrote frequently on women's issues and was author of a legal handbook, "The right of women", 1931. She was the co-founder of the "Austrian women's organization."

When Nazi Germany annexed Austria in 1938 (Anschluss), her name was removed from the registry of attorneys and Beth and her husband emigrated to the United States. From 1939 to 1942, she taught sociology at Reed College, in Portland, Oregon.

Notes

See also 
 First women lawyers around the world

References 
Marianne Beth at the Brooklyn Museum Dinner Party database of notable women. Accessed March 2009
Österreichische Soziologinnen und Soziologen im Exil 1933 bis 1945 In German Accessed March 2009
Marianne Beth entry at the Knowledgebase Adult Education The online knowledge platform for topics relevant to the theory and practice of adult education in Austria. Accessed March 2009 Original German

1889 births
1984 deaths
Lawyers from Vienna
Austrian feminists
Jewish emigrants from Austria to the United States after the Anschluss
Converts to Protestantism from Judaism
Reed College faculty